Lena Kristin Ellingsen (born 14 September 1980) is an actress from Saltdal, Norway.

She graduated from the Norwegian National Academy of Theatre in 2004 and Bårdar Akademiet in 2001. She has worked in Riksteatret, Oslo Nye Teater, Det Norske Teatret and  Teatret Vårt in Molde.

She starred as Karoline (Brynjar's  daughter) in Himmelblå (English: Blue Sky Blue), a Norwegian drama series which has aired on NRK1 in Norway, on SVT in Sweden and RÚV in Iceland.

In the fifteenth episode of Himmelblå, Ellingsen sings the opening theme for the TV series as Karoline (her role in the series) in the town's pavilion alongside Halfdan Sivertsen, a famous singer. The theme song is originally performed by Anne Marie Almedal,  and written by the former along with Nicholas Sillitoe.

She won the Gullruten for Best Actress for her portrayal of Karoline in Himmelblå in 2009.

In 2011 she played the role of Trine in the Norwegian black comedy film Jackpot.

She lives in Oslo with her husband, actor Trond Fausa Aurvåg.

References

External links

1980 births
Living people
People from Saltdal
Norwegian stage actresses
Norwegian television actresses
Oslo National Academy of the Arts alumni